Uromastyx dispar, the Sudan mastigure, is a species of agamid lizard. It is found in Mauritania, Sudan, Chad, Western Sahara, Algeria, and Mali.

There are three subspecies recognized:
Uromastyx  dispar dispar 
Uromastyx (dispar) flavifasciata 
Uromastyx dispar maliensis  – Mali uromastyx

References

Uromastyx
Reptiles described in 1827
Taxa named by Carl von Heyden